This article is about the particular significance of the year 1952 to Wales and its people.

Incumbents
Archbishop of Wales – John Morgan, Bishop of Llandaff
Archdruid of the National Eisteddfod of Wales – Cynan

Events
10 January – An Aer Lingus Douglas DC-3 aircraft on a flight from London to Dublin crashes in Snowdonia, killing twenty passengers and three crew members.
June – Pennar Davies is inaugurated as Principal of Swansea Memorial College.
5 July – Six miners are killed in a mining accident at Point of Ayr colliery in north Wales.
11 August – A Royal Air Force Avro Anson trainer aircraft crash lands on the track of the Snowdon Mountain Railway killing its three aircrew.
3 September – Somali-born Mahmood Hussein Mattan is the last person to be hanged in Cardiff Prison, having been convicted of the 6 March murder of Lily Volpert in Tiger Bay. This becomes the first case considered by the Criminal Cases Review Commission, and in 1998 the conviction is ruled to have been wrongful.
8 October – David Grenfell becomes Father of the House following the retirement of Hugh O'Neill.
19 October – A small Welsh republican group, Y Gweriniaethwyr, make an unsuccessful attempt to blow up the water pipeline leading from the Claerwen dam in mid Wales to Birmingham.
23 October – Opening of Claerwen reservoir, the first engagement carried out in Wales by Elizabeth II since her accession as Queen of the United Kingdom. She first sets foot in Wales as monarch at Llandrindod railway station.
date unknown – Lake Bala bursts its banks and floods many parts of the Vale of Edeirnion.

Arts and literature

Awards
National Eisteddfod of Wales (held in Aberystwyth)
National Eisteddfod of Wales: Chair – John Evans, "Dwylo"
National Eisteddfod of Wales: Crown – withheld
National Eisteddfod of Wales: Prose Medal – Owen Elias Roberts, "Cyfrinachau Natur"

New books

English language
A. H. Dodd – Studies in Stuart Wales
Jack Jones – Lily of the Valley
Bertrand Russell – The Impact of Science on Society
Richard Vaughan – Moulded in Earth
Raymond Williams – Drama from Ibsen to Eliot

Welsh language
Islwyn Ffowc Elis – Cyn Oeri'r Gwaed
T. J. Morgan – Y Treigladau a’u Cystrawen
John Dyfnallt Owen – Rhamant a Rhyddid
R. Williams Parry – Cerddi'r Gaeaf

Drama
Saunders Lewis – Gan Bwyll

Fine arts
 Gwendoline Davies bequeaths a large part of her art collection to the National Museum of Wales, including Renoir's La Parisienne.

Music
David Wynne – Symphony no. 1

Recordings
Dylan Thomas records a collection of five of his poems, including Fern Hill and Do not go gentle into that good night, along with the short prose A Child's Christmas in Wales for Caedmon Audio in New York.

Film
Richard Burton co-stars in My Cousin Rachel, his first U.S. film.

Broadcasting
12 March – Tommy Cooper's TV series, It's Magic, begins its run.
15 August – Wenvoe transmitting station begins broadcasting 405-line VHF BBC Television to south Wales and the west of England on Band I channel 5 (66.75 MHz).
26 August – Hit radio series Welsh Rarebit transfers to television.

Sport
Rugby union – Wales win their fifth Grand Slam.
Summer Olympics – Harry Llewellyn wins a gold medal in the team showjumping competition, riding Foxhunter.

Births
9 January – Mike Watkins, Wales international rugby captain
24 January – Tony Villars, footballer (d. 2020)
12 March – Chris Needs, radio presenter (d. 2020)
22 March – David Jones, politician
3 April – Philip Jenkins, academic and Mastermind champion
16 April – Bob Humphrys, sports broadcaster (d. 2008)
21 April – Cheryl Gillan, politician, Secretary of State for Wales (d. 2021)
5 May – Andrew Davies AM, politician
3 June – David Richards, entrepreneur and businessman
12 June – Jed Williams, jazz journalist
12 August – Robert Minhinnick, poet
7 September – Irene James AM, politician
18 October – Hilary Bevan Jones, television producer
17 November – David Emanuel, fashion designer
20 November – Karen Sinclair, politician
date unknown – Menna Elfyn, poet

Deaths
8 January – Arthur Lewis, photographer, 66
3 March – John Emlyn Emlyn-Jones, shipowner and politician, 63
15 April – Idris Lewis, conductor and composer, 62
25 April (in Broadstairs) – Sir John Milsom Rees, surgeon, 86
14 May – Elizabeth Jane Lloyd, Mrs Louis Jones, academic, 63
31 May – Ifor Leslie Evans, academic, 55
22 August – Llewela Davies, pianist and composer, 81
25 August – James Kitchener Davies, poet, dramatist and nationalist, 50
23 October – Windham Wyndham-Quin, 5th Earl of Dunraven and Mount-Earl, politician, 95
24 October – Ivor Llewellyn Brace, judge, 54
28 October (in Sydney) – Billy Hughes, London-born Prime Minister of Australia, 90
9 November – George Herbert, 4th Earl of Powis, 88
11 November – Sir William Llewelyn Davies, national librarian, 65
28 November – Ernie George, Wales international rugby player, c.81
2 December – Tom Jackson, Wales international rugby player, 82
15 December (in London) – Sir William Goscombe John, sculptor, 92
26 December (in London) – Lyn Harding, actor, 85
31 December – John Cledwyn Davies, politician, 83

See also
1952 in Northern Ireland

References

 
Wales